Hiltrudia is a genus of gastropods belonging to the family Hygromiidae.

The species of this genus are found near Adriatic Sea.

Species:

Hiltrudia globulosa 
Hiltrudia kusmici 
Hiltrudia mathildae

References

Hygromiidae